MacMillan Point is an ice-free point,  north of Cape Chocolate, forming the north side of the entrance to Salmon Bay, on the Scott Coast of Victoria Land, Antarctica. It was named in 1992 by the Advisory Committee on Antarctic Names after Mark T. MacMillan of San Jose, California, a research assistant in the U.S. Antarctic Program who lost his life in a diving accident at New Harbour, McMurdo Sound, on November 14, 1987. A graduate of the University of California at Santa Cruz and a diver, he was in a group collecting Foraminifera from the sea at the time of the accident.

References

Headlands of Victoria Land
Scott Coast